Manuel García Velarde (born 14 September 1941) is a Spanish physicist and university professor, currently a member of the Academia Europaea, the Royal Academy of Doctors of Spain and the European Academy of Sciences. Velarde has worked in American and European universities and research organizations, focusing on fluid dynamics and other non-linear problems, including the kinetic and thermodynamic theories, hydrodynamic and interfacial instabilities, anharmonic lattices and electronics.

Because of his research achievements and international cooperation, he received the insignia of Officer of the National Order of Merit of France, belongs to the Ordre des Palmes Académiques, and holds the Blaise Pascal Medal and the Medal of the Royal Spanish Society of Physics.

Life 

Velarde was born in Almería, Spain, on 14 September 1941. In 1963 he graduated in physics at the Complutense University of Madrid and, thanks to a scholarship, started to work at the Junta de Energía Nuclear (JEN), precursor of the Centro de Investigaciones Energéticas, Medioambientales y Tecnológicas (CIEMAT).

In 1965 he left the JEN, married María del Pilar Ibarz Gil and decided to work for a PhD degree. Influenced by Ilya Prigogine, he ended up getting two PhD degrees, one in 1968 at the Complutense University of Madrid and another in 1970 at the Université Libre de Bruxelles, which allowed him to work both in the Spanish academic world and abroad. From 1969 to 1971 he worked at the University of Texas at Austin, where Prigogine led a research institute.

Back in Spain, in 1971 Velarde started to teach and research at the Autonomous University of Madrid, where he created the Department of Fluid Physics. In 1979 he started to work at the National University of Distance Education, where he created the Department of Physics, and in 1993 he returned to his alma mater, the Complutense University of Madrid, where he worked as a full professor and co-founded the Instituto Pluridisciplinar.

From 1995 to 1997 he was vice-president and, from 1997 to 1999, president of the European Low Gravity Research Association.

Throughout his career, García Velarde has held visiting or invited positions at the universities of Paris-Sud, Pierre and Marie Curie, London, Aix-Marseille, Grenoble, Huazhong, Sofia, Stanford, Cambridge, UC Berkeley, UC Santa Barbara, UC Irvine, Paris-Est Marne-la-Vallée, Libre de Bruxelles, Norwegian of Science and Technology and East China Normal, apart from institutions such as Los Alamos National Laboratory, the Saclay Nuclear Research Centre and the International Center for Mechanical Sciences, of which he was rector from 2002 to 2004.

Awards 

 1991: Academia award of the Spanish Royal Academy of Sciences
 1994: Doctor honoris causa of Aix-Marseille University
 1994: Ordre des Palmes Académiques
 1996: Médaille Rammal of the Société Française de Physique and the Fondation de l'École Normale Supérieure
 2003: Premio DuPont de la Ciencia
 2006: Medal of the Royal Spanish Society of Physics
 2010: Doctor honoris causa of Saratov State University
 2013: National Order of Merit of France
 2015: Blaise Pascal Medal in Physics
 2015: Doctor honoris causa of the University of Almería

References 

1941 births
Living people
People from Almería
Complutense University of Madrid alumni
Officers of the Ordre national du Mérite
Recipients of the Ordre des Palmes Académiques
Members of Academia Europaea
20th-century Spanish physicists
21st-century Spanish physicists